Brigadier Geoffrey Drake-Brockman MC (1885–1977) was a Western Australian civil engineer, and an Australian Army officer in both World Wars.

In 1908 he was involved in mapping the route for the railway-line from Kalgoorlie, Western Australia to Port Augusta, South Australia. In 1921 he was appointed commissioner of the Department of the North-West (of Western Australia) based in Broome; as commissioner he recommended a survey of agricultural land at the Ord River, the planting of cotton and the development of the Kimberley region. In 1946 he was appointed assistant-director of public works, and in 1949 chairman of the Western Australian Transport Board, retiring in 1952.

As a soldier, in World War I he was awarded the Military Cross, and commanded the 9th Field Company in 1917–18. In World War II he was posted to Army Headquarters, Melbourne; as colonel, then brigadier, he occupied senior engineering staff posts.

In retirement, he wrote an autobiography, The Turning Wheel (1960).

Family

His parents were Frederick Slade Drake-Brockman and Grace Bussell. He had four sisters and two brothers, including Major General Edmund Drake-Brockman (1884-1949) and Lady Deborah Vernon Hackett (1887-1965).

In 1917 he married Alice Annie Wardlaw Milne in Hertfordshire, England. She died in 1918.

In 1921 he married Henrietta Frances York Jull (1901-1968) in Guildford, Western Australia. She became a prolific author and also wrote several plays. They had two children, a girl and a boy. A grandson, Geoffrey was named after him.

References

Drake-Brockman family
1885 births
1977 deaths
People from Perth, Western Australia
Australian civil engineers
Australian recipients of the Military Cross